Manuel Lenz (born 23 October 1984 in Herne) is a former German footballer and currently the goalkeeper coach for Rot-Weiss Essen.

References

External links
 
 Manuel Lenz at Fupa

1984 births
Living people
German footballers
Wuppertaler SV players
Rot Weiss Ahlen players
People from Herne, North Rhine-Westphalia
Sportspeople from Arnsberg (region)
FC Schalke 04 II players
SC Preußen Münster players
KFC Uerdingen 05 players
2. Bundesliga players
Association football goalkeepers
Hammer SpVg players
Footballers from North Rhine-Westphalia